Julio Munguía (born 25 April 1942) is a former Mexican cyclist. He competed in the men's tandem at the 1968 Summer Olympics.

References

1942 births
Living people
Mexican male cyclists
Olympic cyclists of Mexico
Cyclists at the 1968 Summer Olympics
Sportspeople from Mexico City